Roberts Jekimovs (born November 11, 1989 in Riga, Latvian SSR, Soviet Union) is a Latvian professional ice hockey forward. He is currently a free agent having last played for Remparts de Tours of the FFHG Division 1 in France.

Playing career
Jekimovs began playing in his native Latvia, playing for SK Riga 20 and SK LSPA/Riga from 2005 to 2008. He then spent a year playing in Sweden for Brynäs IF's J20 team in SuperElit before splitting the 2009–10 season with Dinamo-Juniors Riga in the Belarusian Extraleague and for Jokipojat of Mestis in Finland.

In 2011, Jekimovs signed with SaiPa of the SM-liiga where he managed 7 goals and 13 assists in 43 games. He was re-signed for a second season with SaiPa the following year and improved his scoring from the previous season, notching up 16 goals in 54 games. On April 17, 2013, he joined Ilves but was not able to recapture the same level of form he achieved while at SaiPa, scoring just 5 goals and 6 assists in 39 games and was briefly loaned out to Mestis club Lempäälän Kisa.

On September 25, 2014, Jekimovs agreed to a try-out contract with Austrian club, Graz 99ers of the EBEL. After just 8 games with the 99ers, Jekimovs opted to sign a contract in the Kontinental Hockey League after his rights were traded from Dinamo Riga with Atlant Moscow Oblast on December 24, 2014. He would however only feature in two games for the team.

On September 1, 2015, Jekimovs returned to Latvia to sign for Prizma Riga but played just two games before leaving to join Gentofte Stars of the Metal Ligaen in Denmark 14 days later. He would spend the next two seasons in Denmark, spending the 2016–17 season with the Herning Blue Fox and the 2017–18 season with the Frederikshavn White Hawks.

On August 30, 2018, Jekimovs moved to France and signed for Rapaces de Gap of the Ligue Magnus. He re-signed for a second season with the team in May 2019 but was released on December 13, 2019 and he signed a contract with Division 1 side Remparts de Tours on December 26.

International career
Jekimovs made his debut for the Latvia men's national ice hockey team in 2009 and was a member of their 2009 IIHF World Championship squad, going pointless in four games. He would also play in the 2013 IIHF World Championship where he played six games and scored one goal.

Career statistics

Regular season and playoffs

International

References

External links
 

1989 births
Living people
Atlant Moscow Oblast players
Diables Noirs de Tours players
Frederikshavn White Hawks players
Gentofte Stars players
Graz 99ers players
Herning Blue Fox players
Ilves players
Jokipojat players
Latvian ice hockey forwards
Lempäälän Kisa players
Prizma Riga players
Rapaces de Gap players
SaiPa players
Ice hockey people from Riga
Expatriate ice hockey players in Russia